The La Melpomène class was a group of 12 French torpedo boats built from 1933 to 1935.

Ships in class
After serving with Marine Nationale, the ships of the La Melpomène class saw service in World War II with the Kriegsmarine, Marine Nationale de l´Armistice (Vichy French Navy), Regia Marina, Free French Navy, Royal Navy and Royal Netherlands Navy.

Service histories
La Melpomène was in a British port in June 1940. After brief service with the Royal Navy, she was transferred into FNFL (Free French) service. In 1950 was sold for scrap.
La Pomone was in Vichy service after June 1940. Seized by the Italians at Bizerte, in November 1942, she became the Italian FR42, and the German TA10 in May 1943. In action against HMS Eclipse near Rhodes, she was badly damaged, and scuttled on 27 September 1943.
La Flore on the night of 21 May 1940 at the invitation of Admiral Abrial, carried General Weygand, the recently-installed supreme commander of French Forces, from Dunkirk via Dover to Cherbourg in order to reach Paris, having failed to meet up with Lord Gort, commander of the British Expeditionary Force. Flore had left Dunkirk harbour at full speed during a German air raid. She was in a British port in June 1940. She was transferred into FNFL (Free French) service. In 1950 was sold for scrap.
L'Iphigénie was in Vichy service after June 1940. Seized by the Italians at Bizerte, in November 1942, she became the Italian FR43, and the German TA11 in May 43. She was sunk by Italian MAS motor torpedo boats at Piombino, 10 September 1943.
La Bayonnaise was scuttled in Toulon on November 27, 1942, to avoid her capture. The ship was raised by the Italians and renamed FR44. She was repaired, but was taken over by the Germans after the Italian armistice and were renamed TA13. As TA13 she was scuttled on 23 August 1944.
Bombarde was in Vichy service after June 1940. She was seized by the Italians at Bizerte in November 1942, entering into Italian service as FR41. However, she was once again captured by the Germans during the Italian armistice of September 1943, and were renamed TA9. As TA9 she was sunk by US aircraft off Toulon, 23 August 1944.
L'Incomprise was seized by the British at Portsmouth after the Fall of France. She served with the Free French Forces. At the war's end she was decommissioned and sold for scrap in 1950.
La Poursuivante was in Vichy service after June 1940. She was scuttled in Toulon on November 27, 1942, to avoid her capture, leaving her a total constructive loss.
La Cordelière was seized by the British at Portsmouth on 3 July 1940; she was returned to serve with Free French Forces. At the war's end she was decommissioned and sold for scrap in 1950.
Branlebas was seized by the British at Portsmouth on 3 July 1940; The Branlebas was retained by the Royal Navy but foundered 25 miles off Eddystone on 14 December 1940.
Baliste was in Vichy service after June 1940. She was scuttled in Toulon on November 27, 1942, to avoid her capture. The ship was raised by the Italians and were renamed FR45. She was taken over by the Germans after the Italian armistice and was renamed TA12. As TA12 she was sunk by Allied aircraft on 22 August 1943.
Bouclier was seized by the British at Portsmouth on 3 July 1940; She was first transferred to Royal Dutch Navy and renamed as HNLMS Bouclier, but was returned to Free French forces in January 1941. At the war's end she was decommissioned and sold for scrap in 1950.

References

Bibliography

External links
 Images of the class

 
Torpedo boat classes
World War II destroyers of France
Ship classes of the French Navy